Small Apartments is a 2012 American independent comedy film directed by Jonas Åkerlund. It tells the story of Franklin Franklin, played by Matt Lucas, who by mistake kills his landlord, Mr. Olivetti, played by Peter Stormare. The cast co-stars Dolph Lundgren, Johnny Knoxville, James Caan, Billy Crystal, Juno Temple, Rebel Wilson, Saffron Burrows and Amanda Plummer. The screenplay was written by Chris Millis and adapted from his own novella. The film premiered at the South by Southwest Film Festival on March 10, 2012.

Plot
Franklin Franklin is a hairless, overweight, eccentric social misfit and compulsive hoarder obsessed with Switzerland, who walks around wearing little more than briefs and mismatching socks and lives on a diet consisting of Moxie soda and pickles with mustard. Living alone in an almost bare apartment in a rundown building complex in Southern California populated with other eccentrics, including cynical stoner Tommy Balls, neurotic geriatric recluse Mr. Allspice, and aspiring dancer Simone who lives with her mother – both of whom may or may not be prostitutes.

At an earlier point, Franklin's landlord Mr. Olivetti accidentally died after slipping on spilled mustard caused by sneezing fits when receiving fellatio from Franklin over frequent unpaid rent. In an effort to get rid of Olivetti's body, Franklin takes it to Olivetti's house and tries to stage it as a suicide, implementing an unlikely over-array of suicide methods. Attempting to dump Olivetti's pickup truck in the outskirts of town results in Franklin being robbed (of both his brother's watch and Olivetti's truck) and assaulted by two very dimwitted muggers.

The next day, Franklin wonders why he has not gotten his weekly audiotape from his institutionalized brother Bernard, whom Franklin almost idolizes as he is handsome, charismatic and popular and included Franklin in his social life. 

Unknown to Franklin, Bernard has died of an inoperable brain tumor and among his effects is an envelope holding a key to a locker. In it, there is a recorded message revealing that Bernard stole from his employer and has left Franklin savings in a Swiss bank account and a passport in a new identity. 

Meanwhile, fire investigator Burt Walnut, and other detectives examine Olivetti's body, and quickly conclude that it is staged, and put an APB for his pickup truck. Walnut, visiting the apartment complex, meets Balls and Allspice and becomes suspicious of Franklin. Walnut is estranged from his wife (who was having an affair with his cousin), and learns that Allspice's wife died around the time as Olivetti's wife, 13 years ago.

Working at his convenience store, Balls shatters Simone's dancing dreams with his brutal honesty; upset, she hides in the restroom. He is then held up by Franklin's muggers, who shoot Balls in the torso when startled by Simone. Franklin returns to his apartment, but seeing the police, keeps on driving. Walnut discovers that Allspice has committed suicide, and when answering a phone call by Franklin, is asked to adopt Franklin's dog (also named Bernard). Walnut informs him of the muggers' arrest, calling them Olivetti's murderers, remarking of Olivetti that "some might say that he had it coming to him."

Although innocent, Franklin takes his Switzerland flight, sitting next to Dr. Sage Mennox, a self-help author whom Bernard obsessed over. Franklin tells Dr. Mennox that his brother died and was not insane (as Mennox had previously asserted), but had actually been impaired by a fatal brain tumor "the size of a racquet ball". Mennox is taken off guard by this, and Franklin (who has held a grudge against him for belittling Bernard, his hero, in the past), slyly remarks that they would be stuck together, in this awkward situation, for the duration of a very long flight.

Ultimately, Franklin is seen in Switzerland standing in front of the Matterhorn mountain surrounded by three attractive Swiss women in Swiss folk costume.

Cast

 Matt Lucas as Franklin Franklin
 James Caan as Mr. Allspice, Franklin's neighbor in 204
 Juno Temple as Simone, who lives across the way from Franklin
 Saffron Burrows as Francine
 Peter Stormare as Mr. Olivetti, the landlord
 Johnny Knoxville as Tommy Balls, the neighbor on the other side, who works at Tag's Liquor
 Rebel Wilson as Rocky, Tommy Balls' girlfriend
 James Marsden as Bernard Franklin, Franklin's brother who lives in a mental hospital
 DJ Qualls as Artie, night clerk at Tag's Liquor
 Dolph Lundgren as Dr. Sage Mennox
 Billy Crystal as Burt Walnut, the fire investigator looking into Mr. Olivetti's death
 Noel Gugliemi as Dog walker (driving instructor samaritan)
 David Koechner as Detective Tim O'Grady
 Rosie Perez as Ms. Baker, nurse at the hospital
 Amanda Plummer as Mrs. Ballisteri, Tommy Balls' Mother
 Ned Bellamy as Daniel, the EMT
 Angela Lindvall as Lisa, the flight attendant
 David Warshofsky as Detective Rich Holman
 Alex Solowitz as Sebastian

Production

The film was produced through Deep Sky, Silver Nitrate, Amuse Entertainment and Bonnie Timmermann. It was co-financed by Sense And Sensibility Ventures and Silver Nitrate. According to director Jonas Åkerlund, it was important for him that the production had a strong element of spontaneity; he therefore did not focus solely on the film like he had with his previous features, but also made 34 commercials and five music videos the same year. Small Apartments was made largely with the same crew Åkerlund uses in his other projects. The first actor to be cast was Matt Lucas in the lead.

Filming
Photography took 20 days and ended in April 2011.

Music
The soundtrack, by Per Gessle of Roxette, was released on 17 April 2013.

Release

Theatrical
The film premiered at the South by Southwest Film Festival on 10 March 2012.

Home media
It was released on home media on 19 February 2013.

Reception

Critical response
John DeFore of The Hollywood Reporter wrote that "Small Apartments might crumble if not cemented by a compellingly weird performance by Little Britain's Matt Lucas", and that "even the scene-chewingest performance here (Peter Stormare as the sleazoid landlord, seen in flashback) augments the whole instead of drawing attention from it". DeFore also complimented Billy Crystal, writing that his performance "roots the picture to its ostensible genre while reminding us how engaging the actor can be when he's appearing not to try."

References

External links
 
 Small Apartments on Rotten Tomatoes

2012 films
Films directed by Jonas Åkerlund
Films set in apartment buildings
Films shot in Los Angeles
American comedy films
2010s English-language films
2010s American films